Year of the Dragon is the ninth studio album by American hip hop recording artist Busta Rhymes, it was released by Google Play as a free release on August 21, 2012. The album features guest appearances from Anthony Hamilton, Cam'ron, Robin Thicke, Maino,  Vybz Kartel,  J-Doe, Reek da Villian, Rick Ross, Gucci Mane,  Trey Songz and Lil Wayne.

Background 
The album's title (inspired by the Chinese zodiac) and cover art were revealed on July 9, 2012. The official track list was released on August 8, 2012. It was released on August 21, 2012 for free download via Google Play.

Singles 
The album's lead single "King Tut", featuring Reek da Villian and J-Doe, was released on May 22, 2012. The music video for "King Tut", featuring Reek da Villian and J-Doe, was released on July 25, 2012. The album's second single "Doin' It Again" featuring Reek da Villian and Chanel Nicole was released on August 1, 2012. The music video for "Doin' It Again" featuring Reek da Villian and Chanel Nicole was released on September 12, 2012. The music video for "Movie" featuring J-Doe was released on October 16, 2012.

Critical response 

Year of the Dragon was met with generally mixed reviews from music critics. Slava Kuperstein of HipHopDX gave the album three out of five stars, saying "The problem is the same one that’s plagued just about every single Busta Rhymes album: the Dungeon Dragon cannot decide on a direction for the project. It’s not cohesive in production, styles, or subject matter. Busta’s all over the place, and does nothing to improve his reputation as one of the greatest emcees to not have a great album to his name. Here's to hoping the real album will be better."

Track listing 

Sample notes
 "I'm Talking to You" contains a sample of "Shout", performed by Tears for Fears.
 "Make It Look Easy" contains a sample of "Blues and Pants", performed by James Brown.
 "Love-Heat" contains a sample of "Baby I Don't Like You", performed by The Moments.
 "Grind Real Slow" contains elements of "I Like It", written by Eldra DeBarge, William DeBarge, and Jordan Etterlene.
 "Doin It Again" contains a sample of "Round and Round", performed by Hi-Tek.

References 

2012 albums
Albums produced by Bink (record producer)
Albums produced by Boi-1da
Albums produced by Mr. Porter
Albums produced by Focus...
Busta Rhymes albums
Albums produced by Jahlil Beats
Albums free for download by copyright owner